Ceroplesis granulata is a species of beetle in the family Cerambycidae. It was described by Breuning in 1937. It is known from Uganda.

References

Endemic fauna of Uganda
granulata
Beetles described in 1937